The Royal Oak is a 1923 British silent historical drama film directed by Maurice Elvey and starring Betty Compson, Henry Ainley and Henry Victor. It was based on the 1889 play The Royal Oak by Henry Hamilton and Augustus Harris. The title references the Royal Oak in which Charles is said to have hidden. The film proved popular and was re-released in 1929 by Equity British Films.

Plot
A woman disguises herself as Charles II in order to allow the real King to escape Oliver Cromwell's troops after the Royalist defeat at the Battle of Worcester.

Cast
 Betty Compson as Lady Mildred Cholmondeley 
 Henry Ainley as Oliver Cromwell
 Henry Victor as Charles I of England/ Charles II of England
 Thurston Hall as Colonel Ancketell 
 Clive Brook as Dorian Clavering 
 Bertie Wright as Dearlove 
 Peter Dear as Lord Cholmondeley 
 Dallas Cairns as Pendrel 
 Blanche Walker as Parry 
 Rolf Leslie as Melchizedek

References

External links

1923 films
1920s historical drama films
British silent feature films
British historical drama films
1920s English-language films
English Civil War films
Films set in Shropshire
Films set in the 1640s
Films set in the 1650s
Films directed by Maurice Elvey
Stoll Pictures films
British black-and-white films
1923 drama films
Films shot at Cricklewood Studios
Cultural depictions of Charles II of England
Cultural depictions of Oliver Cromwell
Cultural depictions of Charles I of England
1920s British films
Silent historical drama films